John Macdonald or MacDonald may refer to:

Government

Australia 
John MacDonald (Australian politician) (1880–1937), Australian senator for Queensland

Britain 
John MacDonald II or John of Islay, Earl of Ross (1434–1503), last Lord of the Isles, Scotland
John Macdonald, Lord Kingsburgh (1836–1919), Scottish politician and later a judge
John Macdonald (British politician, born 1854) (1854–1939), British Liberal politician

Canada 
John Small MacDonald (c. 1791–1849), Prince Edward Island merchant and politician
John Sandfield Macdonald (1812–1872), first Premier of Ontario
John A. Macdonald (1815–1891), first Canadian prime minister
John Macdonald (Canadian politician) (1824–1890), member of parliament and later senator
John MacDonald of Glenaladale (1742–1810), Scottish born soldier and Prince Edward Island landowner
John Alexander MacDonald (Prince Edward Island politician) (1838–1905), speaker of the Prince Edward Island assembly
John Alexander Macdonald (Prince Edward Island politician) (1874–1948), member of parliament for King's, Prince Edward Island
John Alexander Macdonald Armstrong (1877–1926), politician, conveyancer and real estate agent in Ontario
John Alexander Macdonald (Nova Scotia politician) (1883–1945), politician in Nova Scotia
John Joseph MacDonald (1891–1986), senator for Prince Edward Island
John Michael Macdonald (1906–1997), senator for Nova Scotia
John Augustine Macdonald (1913–1961), member of parliament for King's, Prince Edward Island
John W. MacDonald (1900–1983), Canadian politician in the Nova Scotia House of Assembly
John A. MacDonald (Nova Scotia politician), politician in Nova Scotia

United States 
John L. MacDonald (1838–1903), American representative from Minnesota
John R. MacDonald (1857–1946), Michigan politician

Literature 
John D. MacDonald (1916–1986), American mystery author
John McDonald, pseudonym of Kenneth Miller (1915–1983), Canadian-American mystery author, better known as Ross Macdonald

Military 
John MacDonald of Garth (1771–1866), Scottish-Canadian participant in the Pemmican war
John Macdonald (British Army officer, died 1850) (bef. 1795–1850), Adjutant-General to the Forces
John Macdonald (British Army officer, born 1907) (1907–1979) 
John Macdonald (Australian Army officer) (1919–1996), University of New South Wales Regiment
John Denis Macdonald  (1826–1908), English naval surgeon and naturalist

Music 
John MacDonald (Canadian musician) (born 1948), Canadian–French horn player
John-Angus MacDonald (active since 1997), Canadian musician and guitarist
John Scantlebury Macdonald, real name of Harry Macdonough (1871–1931), Canadian singer and music recording pioneer
John MacDonald of Inverness (1865–1953), Scottish bagpiper

Religion
John MacDonald (bishop of Aberdeen) (1818–1889), Scottish Roman Catholic bishop
John MacDonald (Gaelic Moderator) (1779–1849), Scottish minister of the Free Church of Scotland, known as the "Apostle of the North"
John MacDonald (vicar apostolic) (1727–1779), Scottish Roman Catholic bishop
John Hugh MacDonald (1881–1965), Canadian Roman Catholic prelate, Archbishop of Edmonton
John Roderick MacDonald (1891–1959), Canadian Roman Catholic prelate, Bishop of Peterborough, Ontario

Sports 
John Macdonald (sportsman) (1861–1938), represented Scotland at both cricket and football
John MacDonald (American football) (active 1918–1919), American football head coach for Boston University
John MacDonald (canoeist) (born 1965), New Zealand Olympic canoer
John MacDonald (footballer, born 1883) (1883–1915), Scottish footballer for Blackburn Rovers, Leeds City, Grimsby Town
John Macdonald (footballer, born 1886) (1886–1960), Scottish footballer for Raith Rovers, Rangers, Liverpool, Newcastle United
John MacDonald (footballer, born 1961), Scottish footballer for Rangers, Barnsley
John MacDonald (ice hockey), Canadian ice hockey player who played for Destil Trappers in the Netherlands
John MacDonald (racing driver) (born 1936), race car driver and motorcycle racer of Hong Kong
Jack Macdonald (sportsman) (1907–1982), New Zealand Olympic rower
John Macdonald (Canadian football) (born 1978), Canadian football defensive linemen
John MacDonald (rugby union, born 1960), Irish rugby union international player
John MacDonald (rugby union, born 1890) (1890–1980), Scottish rugby union player

Other uses
 John Cathanach MacDonald, 4th of Dunnyveg (died 1499)
John Macdonald (psychiatrist) (1920–2007), New Zealand forensic psychiatrist who coined the MacDonald triad of sociopathy
John S. MacDonald, co-founder of MacDonald Dettwiler
John Smyth Macdonald (1867–1941), British physiologist
John Graham MacDonald (1834–1918), explorer and pioneer in Queensland, Australia
John B. Macdonald (1918–2014), president of the University of British Columbia

See also
John McDonald (disambiguation)
Jack MacDonald (disambiguation)